Scheveningen dialect is a dialect of Dutch spoken in the Scheveningen district of The Hague.

References

Further reading

(Prof.dr.) Cor van Bree - Zuid-Hollands (2004) 
Prof.dr. K.H. Heeroma - Hollandse dialektstudies (1935)
Prof.dr. K.H. Heeroma - De Schoonste of het ontzet van Schevening (1963)
Marius Jochemsen - Dialectbehoud en dialectverandering in Scheveningen (1984)
Dirkje Roeleveld - De Scheveningse woordenschat (1986) 
Piet Spaans - Op z'n Schevenings (1985) 
Piet Spaans - Scheveningse Franje (1988) 
Piet Spaans - De spreektaal van de Scheveningse kustbewoners (2004)

External links
 Het dialect van Scheveningen
 De  Scheveningse Woordenschat: dialect van een vissersdorp

Dutch dialects
Languages of the Netherlands
Holland
Culture in The Hague